The 1983–84 Serie A season was the 50th season of the Serie A, the top level of ice hockey in Italy. Eight teams participated in the league, and HC Bolzano won the championship by defeating HC Meran in the final.

Regular season

Playoffs

External links
 Season on hockeyarchives.info

Serie
Serie A (ice hockey) seasons
Italy